The 1973 Midlands International, also known as the Omaha International, was a men's tennis tournament played on indoor carpet courts at the City Auditorium in Omaha, Nebraska in the United States that was part of the 1973 USLTA Indoor Circuit. It was the fourth edition of the event and was held from January 23 through January 28, 1973. First-seeded Ilie Năstase won the singles title and earned $3,000 first-prize money after his opponent in the final, Jimmy Connors, retired with an ankle injury which he sustained in the semifinal. It was Năstase's third consecutive singles title at the event.

Finals

Singles
 Ilie Năstase defeated  Jimmy Connors 5–0 ret.
 It was Năstase's 1st singles title of the year and 25th of his career.

Doubles
 William Brown /  Mike Estep defeated  Jimmy Connors /  Juan Gisbert, Sr. default

Notes

References

External links
 ITF tournament edition details

Midlands International
Midlands International
Midlands International